Dmytro Albertovych Salamatin (born on 26 April 1965 in Karaganda, Kazakh SSR), is a Ukrainian politician, a People's Deputy of Ukraine (in Verkhovna Rada), the First Deputy Head of the Parliamentary Committee for Science and Education and a Member of the Budget Committee (July 2006), the General Director of the State Company for export and import of military and special purpose products and services "Ukrspetsexport"; the General Director of the State Concern "Ukroboronprom" (2010–2012), the Minister of Defence of Ukraine (from 8 February 2012 to 24 December 2012). and a Member of the National Security and Defense Council of Ukraine (from 17 February 2012 to 24 December 2012). In January 2019 the Prosecutor General of Ukraine Office announced they were suspecting Salamatin of the crime "intentional actions aimed at ousting Ukraine from the world arms markets in favor of Russia" and thus he was suspected of "abusing his official position and committing treason in the interests of the Russian Federation." Ukrainian authorities believe that since 2013 Salamantin lives in Russia.

Biography
Born on 26 April 1965 (Karaganda, Kazakh SSR).

Education 
Mining Department of Karaganda Polytechnic Institute with a degree in "Technology and Complex Mechanization of Underground Mining of Mineral Resources" (1989). Retraining Courses of Moscow Mining Institute with a degree in "Engineer Economist" (1991).

Career 
 1983—1985 – served military obligations.
 1985 – miner at Kuzembaeva mine.
 1989—1991 – mine foreman of mining sector at the same place.
 1991—1993 – consultant of Joint Venture Company SITEK (Moscow).
 1993—1994 – Commercial Director of "Russkoe Toplivo" CJSC (Moscow).
 1995—1996 – Chief Expert of "ROL" CJSC (Moscow).
 1996—1997 – Principal Adviser of Milder International Ltd. Company (Moscow).
 From 1998 – Presidential Adviser of the International Mining Congress for Interaction with Ukraine.
 In April 1999 moved to Ukraine where he received Ukrainian citizenship in 2004.
 He was twice elected as the People's Deputy of Ukraine of the Party of Regions (2006 -2011), he was the First Deputy Head of the Parliamentary Committee for Science and Education and the Member of the Budget Committee. Our Ukraine–People's Self-Defense Bloc People's Deputy of Ukraine Volodymyr Stretovych claimed in April 2012 that Salamatin had received Ukrainian citizenship in 2005 and thus was illegally elected into parliament in 2007. According to Central Election Commission of Ukraine member Mykhaylo Okhendovsky Salamatin was legally electable in 2007, because he had been living in Ukraine the prior 5 years.

The article 76 of the Constitution of Ukraine states that:

 2010 – General Director of the State Company for export and import of military and special purpose products and services.
 2011 – General Director of the State Concern "Ukroboronprom”
 From 8 February 2012[2] to 24 December 2012[3] – the Minister of Defense of Ukraine in the first Azarov government.
 He was appointed as the Adviser to President of Ukraine Viktor  Yanukovych on 25 December 2012. He stayed his advisor until February 2014.

Defence-Industrial Complex of Ukraine
The revenue from export of products of the Subsidiary Company "Ukrspetsexport" and its subsidiaries increased by 27% in 2011 and for the first time exceeded $1 bln,

This result was achieved again in 2012 when he was the Ministry of Defense of Ukraine.

During this time Ukraine has achieved strategic partnership with Thailand. Lot of Ukrainian APC-ZE1 was supplied to this country. Thailand also ordered the advanced "Oplot" tanks. Total amount of the contract was half a billion dollars.
He reformed the whole Defense-Industrial Complex of Ukraine in 2011 in the capacity of the Director of the Subsidiary Company "Ukroboronprom". Great portion of indebtedness of the Defense and Industrial Complex enterprises was written off, ensuring the development and proceeding to repayment of arrears in salaries. Exporters were combined into the state concern with the industrial enterprises for the first time, thus enabling to increase the production rate. In the result the number of aircraft of the Armed Forces of Ukraine was doubled as early as 2012. Almost all ships and vessels of the Maritime Forces of Ukraine were repaired; navigation and communication means, new parachute systems and many others were supplied to the troops.

Ministry of Defence of Ukraine 
During the period of his activity as the Minister of Defence of Ukraine in 2012 the average training time of one pilot was reached 51 hours for the first time since gaining the independence, about 42000 parachute jumps were made, considerably exceeding the previous years' figures., First All-Ukrainian tank competitions, starting a real heavy training of the tank troops' specialists, were held at the initiative of the Head of Defence Agency.

High mobility landing troops (airborne troops) of the Armed Forces of Ukraine had been formed on the basis of airborne and airmobile forces.

Precision guided artillery round "Kvitnyk", Armoured Personnel Carrier APC4Е, 30-mm autocannon ZТМ-1 and many other models of armament were put into service. Maneuvers "Perspective 2012" were held in September – October 2012. Perspective systems of control and communication C2/C4i were firstly practiced to perfection at these maneuvers. Military delegation headed by the Minister of Defense of Ukraine visited Afghanistan. 

The concept of the Armed Forces of Ukraine transition to NATO standards by 2014 had been adopted, and English language training system has been introduced. Salamantin claimed in December 2012 that for the first time for many years full-strength fighting squadron appeared in effective combat strength of the Ukrainian Air Force.

Due to conflicts between President Yanukovych and his inner circle in 2012 Salamantin was dismissed as Minister of Defense in December 2012.

Since dismissal as Minister of Defence 
Salamatin moved to Russia in 2013 and according to Ukrainian authorities lives there since. They also claim that in 2015 Salamatin visited incognito the separatist Luhansk People's Republic.

In January 2019 the Prosecutor General of Ukraine Office announced they were suspecting Salamatin of a crime, they suspected him of "intentional actions aimed at ousting Ukraine from the world arms markets in favor of Russia" and thus he was suspected of "abusing his official position and committing treason in the interests of the Russian Federation." Salamantin actions allegedly cost Ukraine $ 560 million.

Family 
Salamantin is married to Natalia. The couple has three sons (born in 1994, 1996 and 2002). Salamatin’s father-in-law Oleg Soskovets was First Deputy Prime Minister of Russia from 1993 until 1996.

Interview 
Министр обороны Саламатин: Проведенную в армии и ОПК работу я бы оценил как наступление по всем фронтам

References

External links

1965 births
21st-century Ukrainian politicians
Living people
People from Karaganda
Ukrainian people of Kazakhstani descent
Russian people of Kazakhstani descent
Russian expatriates in Ukraine
Defence ministers of Ukraine
Fifth convocation members of the Verkhovna Rada
Sixth convocation members of the Verkhovna Rada
Party of Regions politicians
Fugitives wanted by Ukraine
Moscow State Mining University alumni